Kristin Krohn Devold (born 12 August 1961 in Ålesund) is a former Minister of Defence of Norway.

She was elected to the Norwegian Parliament from Oslo in 1993, and was re-elected on two occasions as a representative for Conservative Party.

From 2006 to 2013 she was the secretary-general of the Norwegian Trekking Association. As of September 1, 2013 she is CEO of the Norwegian Hospitality Association. She is divorced and has two children.

She has a Master of Science Degree in Business from the Norwegian School of Economics, Bergen, 1985. She minored in sociology at the University of Bergen in 1986.

Political career
From 2001 to 2005, when the second cabinet Bondevik held office, Krohn Devold was Minister of Defence. During this term her seat in parliament was taken by Hans Gjeisar Kjæstad. Krohn Devold was mentioned as a possible candidate for the position of Secretary General of NATO after George Robertson, but eventually lost out to Jaap de Hoop Scheffer.

A November 2005 Dagbladet article wrote about her "controversial appointment" when in the autumn of 2005 she "appointed Karlsvik to chief of fellesstaben i Forsvaret. This was done before the national election—which led to her departure as chief of defence—and it resulted in strong reaction from the two trade unions BFO and Norges Offisersforbund. - The reactions came because the minister of defence sidelined chief of defence Sverre Diesen, and went outside the stipulations of hovedavtalen i Forsvaret. Dagbladet is aware that Sverre Diesen had a different candidate for this particular job."

On the local level Krohn Devold was a member of Oslo city council from 1991 to 1993.

References

External links
Tina KHIDASHELI and Kristin Krohn DEVOLD: Female Defense Ministers from Georgia and Norway discuss NATO, gender, civil society: interview for Caucasian Journal (2021)

1961 births
Living people
Members of the Storting
Conservative Party (Norway) politicians
Politicians from Oslo
Female defence ministers
Norwegian School of Economics alumni
University of Bergen alumni
Politicians from Ålesund
Women members of the Storting
Norwegian city councillors
20th-century Norwegian women politicians
21st-century Norwegian politicians
21st-century Norwegian women politicians
20th-century Norwegian politicians
Women government ministers of Norway
Defence ministers of Norway
Women local politicians